Casafranca - is a Polish coat of arms. It was used by several szlachta families in the times of the Polish–Lithuanian Commonwealth.

History

Blazon

Notable bearers

Notable bearers of this coat of arms include:

See also

 Polish heraldry
 Heraldry
 Coat of Arms
 List of Polish nobility coats of arms

Sources 
 Dynastic Genealogy
 Ornatowski.com

Casafranca